Ion Barbu (born 12 June 1930) is a Romanian racewalker. He competed in the men's 20 kilometres walk at the 1956 Summer Olympics.

References

External links
 

1930 births
Possibly living people
Athletes (track and field) at the 1956 Summer Olympics
Romanian male racewalkers
Olympic athletes of Romania
Place of birth missing (living people)